Tarık Daşgün (born 26 August 1973 in Ankara) is a Turkish football manager and former player. In 2005 he was found guilty of doping.

Club career
He played for Gençlerbirliği S.K., Fenerbahçe S.K., Kocaelispor, Ankaragücü and Yimpaş Yozgatspor in the Turkish Süper Lig, appearing in more than 180 league matches and scoring 40 goals.

In 2005 he was found guilty of doping.

He also played for Tokatspor and retired from football at Belediye Bingölspor in 2007.

International career
Daşgün made two appearances for the full Turkey national football team, his debut coming in a friendly against Chile on 22 June 1995.

Personal

He graduated from Gazi University.

References

External links
 Manager profile at TFF

1973 births
Living people
Turkish footballers
Turkey international footballers
Gençlerbirliği S.K. footballers
Fenerbahçe S.K. footballers
Kocaelispor footballers
MKE Ankaragücü footballers
Sakaryaspor footballers
Kardemir Karabükspor footballers
Turkish football managers
Doping cases in association football
Turkish sportspeople in doping cases
Association football midfielders